Sidney's Candy (foaled January 27, 2007 in Kentucky) is an American Thoroughbred racehorse. He is sired by Candy Ride out of the Storm Cat mare Fair Exchange. He was named after Sidney Craig.

Racing career 

Sidney's Candy set a new track record for five and one half furlongs (1:02.71) in his maiden win on August 22, 2009, at Del Mar. He was sent to the sidelines following the race due to sore shins. He returned to the track in an allowance race at Santa Anita on December 30 and finished fourth after hopping and stumbling at the start.

He began his three-year-old season with a  victory in the seven furlong GII San Vicente Stakes. He followed that up with a half-length victory in the one and one sixteenth mile GII San Felipe Stakes, beating previously undefeated graded stakes winner Caracortado. 

Sidney's Candy won the first Grade I of his career when he wired the field in the 2010 Santa Anita Derby, winning by four and a half lengths under jockey Joe Talamo. It was the first Santa Anita Derby victory for Talamo and Southern California-based trainer John W. Sadler.

Sidney's Candy started in the 20th position at the 2010 Kentucky Derby.

On July 31, 2011, Sidney's Candy (now owned by WinStar Farm and the Rubio B Stable), won the Fourstardave Handicap.

Pedigree

References
 Sidney's Candy's pedigree and racing stats
 The Jockey Club registry for Sidney's Candy

2007 racehorse births
Racehorses bred in Kentucky
Racehorses trained in the United States
Thoroughbred family 1-m